Oskar Schulz (14 October 1923 – 20 September 2017) was an Austrian cross-country skier who competed in the 1950s. He finished 48th in the 18 km event at the 1952 Winter Olympics in Oslo. Four years later he was a member of the Austrian relay team which finished eleventh in the 4 x 10 km relay event. He later was a professor at the Institute for Mineralogy and Petrography at the University of Innsbruck. In 1990, he was made a founding member of the European Academy of Sciences and Arts.

References

External links
18 km Olympic cross country results: 1948-52

1923 births
2017 deaths
Austrian male cross-country skiers
Olympic cross-country skiers of Austria
Cross-country skiers at the 1952 Winter Olympics
Cross-country skiers at the 1956 Winter Olympics
Members of the European Academy of Sciences and Arts
Academic staff of the University of Innsbruck
Austrian mineralogists
20th-century Austrian people